Maurílio Teixeira-Leite Penido (Petrópolis, November 2, 1895 - Rio de Janeiro, June 23, 1970) was a Brazilian Roman Catholic priest and writer.

He was a pupil of Henri Bergson.

Books 

 A Função da Analogia na Teologia Dogmática. Editora Vozes Limitada. Petrópolis, R.J. 1946
 Deus no Bergsonismo. 1993.
 Le methode de Bergson. 1993.
 Newman. 1994.
 O Itinerário Místico de São João da Cruz. Rio de Janeiro: Diadorim. 1995.

References 

20th-century Brazilian Roman Catholic priests
Brazilian writers
People from Petrópolis
1895 births
1970 deaths